Sundelin is a Swedish surname that may refer to
Jörgen Sundelin (born 1945), Swedish Olympic sailor 
Matti Sundelin (born 1934), Finnish football player
Peter Sundelin (born 1947), Swedish Olympic sailor, brother of Ulf and Peter
Stefan Sundelin (1936–2003), Swedish Olympic sailor, cousin of Jörgen, Peter and Ulf
Ulf Sundelin (born 1943), Swedish Olympic sailor, brother of Jörgen and Peter

Swedish-language surnames